Bupalus is a genus of moths in the family Geometridae.

Selected species
 Bupalus piniaria – bordered white
 Bupalus vestalis Staudinger, 1897

References
 Bupalus at Markku Savela's Lepidoptera and Some Other Life Forms
Natural History Museum Lepidoptera genus database

Ennominae